Reinhild Möller (born February 24, 1956, in Schwalm-Eder-Kreis) is a German former alpine ski racer.

She is the only alpine skier to win 19 Paralympic medals. She has also won 4 Paralympic medals in athletics.

When she was 3 years old, she lost half of her left leg in a farm accident. She has lived in the United States since about 1990. She is married to U.S. Paralympic skier Reed Robinson. Möller is the first athlete with a disability to receive a $1 million sponsorship contract.

References

Reinhild Möller (German), munzinger.de

Paralympic gold medalists for Germany
Paralympic silver medalists for Germany
Paralympic bronze medalists for Germany
Alpine skiers at the 1980 Winter Paralympics
Athletes (track and field) at the 1984 Summer Paralympics
Alpine skiers at the 1984 Winter Paralympics
Athletes (track and field) at the 1988 Summer Paralympics
Alpine skiers at the 1988 Winter Paralympics
Alpine skiers at the 1992 Winter Paralympics
Alpine skiers at the 1994 Winter Paralympics
Alpine skiers at the 1998 Winter Paralympics
Alpine skiers at the 2006 Winter Paralympics
1956 births
Living people
Medalists at the 2006 Winter Paralympics
Medalists at the 1998 Winter Paralympics
Medalists at the 1994 Winter Paralympics
Medalists at the 1992 Winter Paralympics
Medalists at the 1988 Winter Paralympics
Medalists at the 1984 Winter Paralympics
Medalists at the 1980 Winter Paralympics
Medalists at the 1984 Summer Paralympics
Medalists at the 1988 Summer Paralympics
German female alpine skiers
Paralympic medalists in athletics (track and field)
Paralympic athletes of Germany
German female sprinters
Sprinters with limb difference
Paralympic sprinters